Armin Andres (born 5 April 1959) is a former German former basketball player. He competed in the men's tournament at the 1992 Summer Olympics.

References

External links
 

1959 births
Living people
German men's basketball players
Olympic basketball players of Germany
Basketball players at the 1992 Summer Olympics
Sportspeople from Bamberg